Eldora Airport  is a privately-owned, public-use airport located two nautical miles (4 km) southwest of the central business district of Eldora, a city in Hardin County, Iowa, United States.

Facilities and aircraft 
Eldora Airport covers an area of 17 acres (7 ha) at an elevation of 979 feet (298 m) above mean sea level. It has one runway designated 18/36 with a turf surface measuring 2,750 by 100 feet (838 x 30 m).

For the 12-month period ending July 29, 2011, the airport had 304 general aviation aircraft operations, an average of 25 per month.

See also 
 List of airports in Iowa

References

External links 
 Eldora Municipal (27P) at Iowa DOT airport directory
 Aerial image as of April 1994 from USGS The National Map

Defunct airports in the United States
Eldora, Iowa
Airports in Iowa
Transportation buildings and structures in Hardin County, Iowa